Platyla orthostoma is a species of very small land snail with an operculum, a terrestrial gastropod mollusc or micromollusk in the family Aciculidae. This species is endemic to Bulgaria.

References

orthostoma
Endemic fauna of Bulgaria
Molluscs of Europe
Gastropods described in 1979
Taxonomy articles created by Polbot